TransGoldfields is the brand name of the bus system in Kalgoorlie-Boulder.

Ticketing
Paper tickets can be bought on the buses. The SmartRider card is valid for use on TransGoldfields services.

External links
Public Transport Authority
TransGoldfields Bus Fleet List

References

Bus companies of Western Australia